GWI may refer to:

 Garden World Images, a horticultural image library
 Genesee & Wyoming, an American railroad
 Germanwings, a German airline
 GWI (company), an audience targeting company
 Golden West Invitational, an American college track and field meet
 Gui (food), Korean grilled dishes
 Gulf War illness
 GWI.net, an English telecommunications company
 Gwi language, native to Botswana
 Gwi people
 Gwich’in language, native to Canada and the United States